WPIB is a Contemporary Christian formatted broadcast radio station licensed to Bluefield, West Virginia, serving the New River Valley.  WPIB is owned and operated by Positive Alternative Radio, Inc.

External links
 Spirit FM Online
 
 
 

PIB